Shubham Saudiyal (born 13 August 1995) is an Indian cricketer. He made his List A debut for Uttarakhand in the 2018–19 Vijay Hazare Trophy on 26 September 2018.

References

External links
 

1995 births
Living people
Indian cricketers
Uttarakhand cricketers
Place of birth missing (living people)